The Tatar Wikipedia is the Tatar language edition of Wikipedia. Launched in September 2003, It currently has  articles, making it the  largest Wikipedia by article count. This Wikipedia has  administrators along with  registered users and  active users.

The Tatar Wikipedia mainly uses the Cyrillic script. However, unlike most other Cyrillic-based languages, some of the articles are in Latin script; accordingly, the language name appears in the language sidebar in both scripts.

References

External links
Tatar Wikipedia

Wikipedias by language
Internet properties established in 2003
Tatar encyclopedias